LGFC  may refer to:

 Leverstock Green F.C., an English football club
 Lions Gibraltar F.C., a Gibraltarian men's football club
 Lions Gibraltar F.C. Women, a Gibraltarian women's football club